Adam Saad (born 8 February 2004) is a Ghanaian footballer who currently plays as a forward for Ghana Premier League side Dreams.

Career statistics

Club

Notes

References

2004 births
Living people
Ghanaian footballers
Association football forwards
Ghana Premier League players
Dreams F.C. (Ghana) players